Shivangi is a given name. Notable people with the name include:

Shivangi Bhayana (born 1996), Indian playback singer and actress
Shivangi Joshi (born 1998), Indian television actress and model
Shivangi Kolhapure (born 1964), Playback Singer
Shivangi Krishnakumar (born 2000), Indian playback singer, actress and television personality.
Shivangi Singh (born 1995), Indian Air Force
Shivangi Verma (born 1994),  Indian actress and entertainer
Shivangi Pathak (born 2002), Indian mountaineer